Hi-Yo Silver! was a musical solo project by Bjørn Kulseth, the former lead singer and songwriter of the Norwegian rock band the Act. The only Hi-Yo Silver! album was entitled Away and was released in 1988.

History 
The first and thus far only solo album by the Norwegian singer and songwriter Bjørn Kulseth was recorded in the summer of 1987. After a week of preproduction in the Pan Studio in Skjetten north of Oslo, producer Steve Forward and Bjørn Kulseth spent the next five weeks in UK recording studios owned by Phil Manzanera and Manfred Mann: The Gallery in Chertsey and The Workhouse in South London respectively.

The resulting album was credited to Hi-Yo Silver! and entitled Away, which in combination is the command that the cartoon/film hero The Lone Ranger gives to his horse Silver at the end of every story as they ride away in search for new adventures.

Even though the Hi-Yo Silver! album featured a few country & western touches such as pedal and lap steel guitar, the overall sound is more contemporary late 1980s pop music with sequencers, synthesizers and even some dance oriented grooves.

In fact the first version of the cover, with a portrait of Kulseth taken late at night at great expense in front of a joyride in the Gothenburg fairground Liseberg, was rejected by EMI for looking too "country". So the released cover features Kulseth sitting in the shuttle of a space rocket, wearing a fringed silver leather jacket and cradling his newly silver painted Gretch-guitar with the name "Silver" engraved on the neck.

Despite a big budget from EMI and much acclaim from the media, Away proved to be a commercial failure when it was released in Norway in March 1988. By then though, Kulseth and his younger brother Stein Kulseth had already started a new roots rock band called The Contenders.

Musicians
Ian Porter – programming and keyboards
John Lingwood – drums
Dave Bronze – bass
Robin Boult – guitars
Tommy Willis – lap steel guitar
Vic Collins – pedal steel guitar
Matt Irving – keyboards
Chris Batchelor – trumpet
Frank Mead – saxophone
Steve Sidelnyk – percussion
John Wilson – backing vocals
Tim Haine – backing vocals
The Sapphires – backing vocals
Bjørn Kulseth – vocals and guitars

Discography

Album
Away (1988), EMI Odeon

Singles
 "Get Rich (In a Hurry)" b/w "Top of the World" (1988), EMI Odeon
 "Nervous in the Night" b/w "My Father's Name Is Dad" (1988), EMI Odeon
 "Nervous in the Night" (12" Takeoff Mix) b/w "My Father's Name Is Dad" / "Nervous in the Night" (1988), EMI Odeon

Sources
 Norwegian pop and rock encyclopaedia. Vega Forlag 2005. .
 G-STRENG Website

1962 births
Living people
Norwegian guitarists
Norwegian male guitarists
Norwegian male singers
Norwegian singer-songwriters